Cătălin Cherecheș (born 7 July 1978) is a Romanian politician who is currently serving as mayor of Baia Mare since 2011.

Biography 
Between 2005 and 2007, Cherecheș was the vice president and spokesperson of the Maramureș County organization of the Social Democratic Party.

Cherecheș was elected in 2008 to the Chamber of Deputies on the Social Democratic Party. He resigned the party in February 2010, becoming an independent member of Parliament and in May 2010 joined the National Liberal Party.

In May 2011, following the criminal conviction of mayor Cristian Anghel, a by-election was held in Baia Mare. Cherecheș was named candidate of the Social Liberal Union. He won the elections from the first round, getting 18,298 votes (51,66%). Following his election, he resigned from the Parliament.

During the 2012 Romanian local elections, again as the candidate of the Social Liberal Union, he was reelected mayor of Baia Mare, receiving 44,239 votes (86.03%), far ahead of Democratic-Liberal Ștefan Pop, who received only 2,785 votes.

In September 2013, Cherecheș joined the National Union for the Progress of Romania.

Nevertheless, on 5 June 2016 Cherecheș ran as a candidate of the local Coalition for Baia Mare and was re-elected mayor while detained with 70.28% of the votes counted, according to the partial election results, a first in Romanian politics.

References 

1978 births
People from Baia Mare
Social Democratic Party (Romania) politicians
Mayors of places in Romania
Living people
National Union for the Progress of Romania politicians
National Liberal Party (Romania) politicians
Members of the Chamber of Deputies (Romania)